Selvagem Pequena Island is an island in the southeast group of the Savage Islands, Madeira, Portugal. It is the southernmost major island of Portugal (excluding islets). Its fauna and flora are well-preserved due to lack of human interference.

In the 1890 book The Cruise of the Alerte, the island was called the 'Great Piton'. 

It has an active lighthouse.

References

Islands of Portugal
Savage Islands